Kim Hyesoon is a South Korean poet.

Life
Kim Hyesoon was born in Uljin County, North Gyeongsang Province. She was raised by her grandmother and had tuberculous pleurisy as a child. She received her Ph.D. in Korean literature from Konkuk University and began her career as a poet in 1979 with the publication of the poem "Poet Smoking a Cigarette" ("Dambaereul piuneun siin") along with four other of her poems in the literary magazine Literature and Intellect (Munhak-kwa Jiseong). Kim is an important contemporary poet in South Korea, and she lives in Seoul and teaches creative writing at the Seoul Institute of the Arts. Kim was in the forefront of women published in Literature and Intellect.

Work
Kim started to receive critical acclaim in the late 1990s. Her own belief is that her work was recognized at that time in no small part because the 1990s in South Korea were noted for a generally strong wave of women poets and women's poetry.

Kim is the recipient of multiple literary prizes including the Kim Su-yeong Literature Award (1996) for her poem "A Poor Love Machine", the Sowol Poetry Prize (2000), and the Midang Literary Award (2006), which are named after three renowned contemporary Korean poets. Kim was the first woman poet to receive the Kim Su-yeong Literature Award, Midang Literary Award, Contemporary Poetry Award, and Daesan Literary Award. More recently she has also received the Lee Hyoung-Gi Literary Award (2019), the Griffin Poetry Prize (2019), the Cikada Prize, and the Samsung Ho-Am Prize in the Arts (2022) U.K Royal Society of Literature International writer (2022).

Kim's poetry collections include: From another star (1981), Father's scarecrow (1985), The Hell of a certain star (1987), Our negative picture (1991), My Upanishad, Seoul (1994), A Poor Love Machine (1997), To the Calendar Factory Manager (2000), A Glass of Red Mirror (2004), Your First (2008), Sorrowtoothpaste Mirrorcream (2011), Blossom, Pig (2016), Autobiography of Death (2016), and Wing Phantom Pain (2019).'After Earth Dies, who will Moon Orbit?(2022).

Kim has participated in readings at poetry festivals all over the world: Smith College Poetry Center (2003), Taipei Poetry Festival (2008), 41st Poetry International Festival Rotterdam (2010), Poesie Festival Berlin (2011), Poetry Parnassus London (2012), Stockholm international Poetry Festival(2014), Hong Kong International Poetry nights(2015), Festival for World Literature Cologne (2018), The Center for Art of Translation (2019), Poetry Foundation (2019), AAWW (2019), Fokus Lylic – Festivalkongress, Frankfurt (2019), Mason de Ra Poesie Paris (2019), L'École normale Supérieure (2019), St, John's College, Cambridge (2019), New Castle Poetry Festival (2019), Litteratur Huset Trondheim Norway (2019), Litteratur pa Bla, Oslo (2019), Terrapolis, Charlottenborg Copenhagen (2019), and the 51st Poetry International Festival Rotterdam (2021), Stockholm international Poetry Festival(2022).

Kim Hyesoon's poetry was used for Jenny Holzer's exhibit at the Korean National Museum of Modern contemporary Art.

Kim's skill as a writer resides in her facility at combining poetic images with experimental language while simultaneously grounding her work in ‘feminine writing’ drawn from female experiences. Her language is violent and linguistically agile, appropriate for her topics which often center on death and/or injustice. A landmark feminist poet and critic in her native South Korea, Kim Hyesoon's surreal, dagger-sharp poetry has spread from hemisphere to hemisphere in the past ten years, her works translated to Chinese, Swedish, English, French, German, Dutch, Danish and beyond. Kim Hyesoon raises a glass to the reader in the form of a series of riddles, poems conjuring the you inside the me, the night inside the day, the outside inside the inside, the ocean inside the tear. Kim's radical, paradoxical intimacies entail sites of pain as well as wonder, opening onto impossible—which is to say, visionary—vistas. Again and again, in these poems as across her career, Kim unlocks a horizon inside the vanishing point.

Works in EnglishPhantom Pain Wings New Directions Publishing, translated by Don Mee Choi A Drink of Red Mirror Action Books The Autobiography of Death New Directions Publishing, translated by Don Mee Choi  (the 2019 Griffin Poetry Prize)Poor Love Machine Action Books I'm O.K, I'm Pig Bloodaxe Books Sorrowtoothpaste Mirrorcream Action Books Mommy Must be a Fountain of Feathers Action Books Anxiety of Words (Collection with other authors) Zephyr Press All the Garbage of the World, Unite! Action Books 
When the Plug Gets UnpluggedPrincess Abandoned (essays), (Tinfish, 2012)Trilingual Renshi Vagabond Press 

Added to The &NOW Awards 2: The Best Innovative Writing'' (&NOW Books, 2013)

Works in Korean 
From Another Star, Munhak kwa chisŏng sa, Seoul, 1981
Father's Scarecrow, Munhak kwa chisŏng sa, Seoul, 1985
The Hell of a Certain Star, Ch’ŏngha Seoul, 1988. Reprinted by Munhakdongnae, 1997
Our Negative Picture, Munhak kwa chisŏng sa, Seoul, 1991
My Upanishad, Seoul, Munhak kwa chisŏng sa, Seoul, 1994
A Poor Love Machine, Munhak kwa chisŏng sa, Seoul, 1997
To the Calendar Factory Manager, Munhak kwa chisŏng sa, Seoul, 2000
A Glass of Red Mirror, Munhak kwa chisŏng sa, Seoul, 2004
Your First, Munhak kwa chisŏng sa, Seoul, 2008
Sorrowtoothpaste Mirrorcream, Munhak kwa chisŏng sa, Seoul 2011
Blossom, Pig, Munhak kwa chisŏng sa, Seoul 2016
The Autobiography of Death, Munhaksilheomsil, Seoul 2016
Phantom Pain of wings, Munhak kwa chisŏng sa, Seoul 2019
After Earth Dies, who will Moon Orbit?, Munhak kwa chisŏng sa, Seoul 2022

Essays
 To Write as a Woman: Lover, Patient, Poet, and You (Seoul: Munhakdongnae, 2002) - Essay on Poetry
 Thus Spoke No (Poessay) (Seoul: Munhakdongane, 2016)
 Women, Do Poetry (Seoul:  Munhak kwa chisŏng sa, 2017)
 Do Womananimalasia (Seoul: Munhak kwa chisŏng sa, 2019)

Interview

https://www.kln.or.kr/frames/interviewsView.do?bbsIdx=387

Awards
Kim Su-yeong Award (1997)
Sowol Poetry Award (2000)
Contemporary Poetry Award (2000)
Korea Culture and Arts Foundation 'This Year's' Art Prize (2004)
Midang Literature Award (2006)
Daesan Literature Award (2008)
Lee Hyoung-Gi Literary Award (2019)
Korea Culture & Art Prize (2019)
Griffin Poetry Prize (2019)
Cikada Prize (2021, Sweden)
Ho-Am Prize in the Arts (2022)
U.K Royal Society of Literature International writer (2022)

See also
List of Korean-language poets
List of Korean female writers

References

External links 
Tarpaulin Sky Press: Kim Hyesoon’s A Drink of Red Mirror
Korean Literature Now: A Note on Kim Hyesoon's Autobiography of Death
Korean Literature Now: A Singularity. Kim Hyesoon
rain taxi: Autobiography of Death
The Poetry Society: Book Review: Midnight Sun
Tarpaulin Sky Press: Kim Hyesoon, A Drink of Red Mirror
The Oprah Magazine: 17 of the Best Poetry Books, as Recommended by Acclaimed Writers for National Poetry Month
Three Percent: The 2019 Best Translated Book Award Longlists
Secret Feminist Agenda: episode 3.23 Pain
Kenyon review: March 2019 Micro Reviews
Rumpus: Painful Celebrations: Five Books for National Poetry Monty
Yellow Rabbits: 63 A Drink of Red Mirror by Kim Hyesoon
A Medium Corporation: The Home inside the Body: Real Chaos Astrology vol.13
International Examiner: Autobiography of Death: Forty-Nine Poems to Guide You to the Afterlife
HTMLGIANT / Kim Hyesoon
Forty-nine days of the spirit: Autobiography of Death by Kim Hyesoon roughghosts.com
"I Refuse to Review": Literary Criticism and Kim Hyesoon's Autobiography of Death Ploughshares at Emerson College
Autobiography of Death by Kim Hyesoon Galatea Resurrects 2018
Autobiography of Death The Arkansas International
Four Poems from Kim Hyesoon's 'Autobiography of Death' Cordite Poetry Review
Review of Kim Hyesoon’s poetry as well as the poetry written by her translator Don Mee Choi.
The Salt Dress inside Me Hong Kong Review of Books
Autobiography of Death Publishers Weekly
Poor Love Machine Publishers Weekly
Souvenirs du Livre des morts tibétain En Attendant Nadeau
The Toxic & the Lyric II: Hearing and Hell; Inversion as Subversion; Everyone, or, the Dead; the Child-Migrant Fanzine
The Politics of Translation, Part 1 Center for the Art of Translation
Poet and Pig The Oxonian Review
Poor Love Machine Angel City Review
The Vanishing Point: Writers Speak to Kim Hyesoon’s Poetry in Translation Asian American Writer's Workshop
What's New in Translation? June 2016 Asymptote
Kim Hyesoon's Sorrowtoothpaste Mirrorcream" reviewed by Lisa A. Flowers Tarpaulin Sky Press
Out of Unison: An AfFormation Ephemera Dance Company
Et la vie même se retourne comme un gant, nous dit Kim Hyesoon Mediapart
Unleashing Her Tongue: Poor Love Machine by Kim Hyesoon Korean Literature Now
Kim Hyesoon - Goodness, I didn't Know there were Such Repulsive Holes! Zoran Rosko Vacuum Cleaner
Ch'oe Sŭng-ja, Kim Hyesoon, and Yi Yŏn-ju, Anxiety of Words: Contemporary Poetry by Korean Women, Zephyr Press, 2006 Diagram 15.5
HTMLGIANT / 25 Points: All the Garbage of the World Unite! HTMLGINAT
Meme is a lone tree that got planted in a bed Jacket 2
Contagious Poetry Jacket 2
An Expelled Tongue: Translating Kim Hyesoon Asian American Writer's Workshop
Sorrowtoothpaste Mirrorcream by Kim Hyesoon Project Muse
Poetry or Letter To the Other of My Inside-Outside: Poet Kim Hyesoon Korean Literature Now
The Sick World of Kim Hyesoon Hyperallergic
Mommy must be a Fountain of Feathers by Kim Hyesoon, translated by Don Mee Choi Bookslut
A Feminist Ontology of Ooziness: On Kim Hyesoon The Critical Flame
All the Garbage of the World Unite! by Kim Hyesoon The Quarterly Conversation
Eyeful: Kim Hyesoon's Poetics & Poetry Hinging the Spirit's Experience Poetry Foundation
American Art Need More Holes Vice
This is the Ek-Static City: Thoughts on Kim Hyesoon's Poetry and Poetics HTMLGIANT
Interview with Kim Hyesoon in Guernica
Interview with Kim Hyesoon at KTLIT
Holey Holey Holey: Reading Kim Hyesoon Southerly Journal
Sorrowtoothpaste Mirrorcream by Kim Hyesoon The Collagist
The Gurlesque Deformation Zone: Kim Hyesoon, Maria Margarete Österholm Montevidayo
Boo Review: All the Garbage of the World, Unite! Alchemy: Journal of Translation
Toward a Sensationalistic Theory of Translation The Volta
Three books by Kim Hyesoon, Translated by Don Mee Choi Galatea Resurrects #20
Poetry round-up: From letters of war to questions of faith and sex Independent
Even after winning acclaim, poet still struggles with gender, label Yonhap News
Sorrowtoothpast Mirrocream Today's Book of Poetry by Michael Dennis
Review: I'm Ok, I'm Pig! by Kim Hyesoon Poetry Wales
Kim Hyesoon: Som poet lever jag alltid i sorg SVT Nyeheter
Kim Hyesoon: The Female Grotesque Guernica
Interview with Poet Kim Hyesoon Korean Literature in Translation
Mommy Must Be a Fountain of Feathers Constant Critic
Puke Silk: Rihanna and Kim Hyesoon Montevidayo

20th-century South Korean poets
South Korean feminists
1955 births
Living people
21st-century South Korean poets
South Korean women poets
20th-century South Korean women writers
21st-century South Korean women writers
Konkuk University alumni
Midang Literary Award winners
Recipients of the Ho-Am Prize in the Arts